() is an enzyme with systematic name  (adding 7 isopentenyl units). This enzyme catalyses the following chemical reaction

 geranylgeranyl diphosphate + 7 isopentenyl diphosphate  7 diphosphate + tritrans,heptacis-undecaprenyl diphosphate

This enzyme is involved in the biosynthesis of the glycosyl carrier lipid in some archaebacteria.

References

External links 

EC 2.5.1